Ken Sparks (February 25, 1944 – March 29, 2017) was an American football coach and player.  He served as the head football coach at Carson–Newman University in Jefferson City, Tennessee from 1980 until his retirement at the end of the 2016 season. He is currently the record-holder for the most wins as a coach in NCAA Division II history.  His Carson–Newman Eagles won five NAIA Championships (1983–1984, 1986, 1988–1989), and were three times runners-up in the NCAA Division II playoffs (1996, 1998, and 1999).

Biography
Sparks was born in Knoxville, Tennessee.  He played college football as a wide receiver at Carson–Newman and graduated from the school in 1968. He was football coach at Gibbs High School in Knoxville. The next year, he received a master's degree from Tennessee Technological University where he also coached quarterbacks and receivers. He coached at Morristown East High School in Morristown, Tennessee.

In the early 1970s, Sparks was an assistant coach on the Carson–Newman football team that was a runner up in the NAIA championship game. He coached the school's track team and he was named Southern Collegiate Track Coach of the Year. In 1977, he returned to Carson-Newman where he coached the track team.

In the fall, he coached at Farragut High School in Knoxville where he accumulated a 29–5 record. Among his players was Bill Bates.

Following his string of successes, Carson-Newman built the new Burke–Tarr Stadium in 2005.

Sparks, who was once Fellowship of Christian Athletes National Coach of the Year, actively pursues a Christian aspect in his coaching and is a popular public speaker. He was quoted as saying that, if football can be used as a tool to bring people to the Lord, then "it has done something. If it hasn't, we haven't done a thing, no matter how many games we won."

After 37 years as the head coach at Carson-Newman University, Ken Sparks announced his retirement on November 14, 2016, at a press conference in the Ken Sparks Athletic Complex on the campus of Carson-Newman University.

Sparks died March 29, 2017, after a four-year battle with prostate cancer.

Head coaching record

College

See also
 List of college football coaches with 200 wins
 List of presidents of the American Football Coaches Association

References

External links
 Carson–Newman profile

1944 births
2017 deaths
Carson–Newman Eagles football coaches
Carson–Newman Eagles football players
Tennessee Tech Golden Eagles football coaches
High school football coaches in Tennessee
Tennessee Technological University alumni
People from Knoxville, Tennessee
Deaths from prostate cancer
Deaths from cancer in Tennessee